Amy Sheldon (born July 20, 1966) is an American Democratic politician. Since January 2015 she serves as member of the Vermont House of Representatives from Addison 1 district.

References

1966 births
Living people
Politicians from Memphis, Tennessee
Women state legislators in Vermont
Democratic Party members of the Vermont House of Representatives
University of Vermont alumni
21st-century American politicians
21st-century American women politicians